Bad Girl (バッド・ガール) is the third studio album by Carlos Toshiki & Omega Tribe released by VAP  on September 21, 1989, and later Warner Music Japan on February 21, 1991. The album peaked at No. 11 on the Oricon charts.

Background and composition 
Released in the same year as their previous album, Be Yourself, the album included ten songs which were produced by Koichi Fujita and Hiroshi Shinkawa. They also had lyricist Yasuharu Konishi, Yasushi Akimoto and Chinfa Kan with Tamotsu Yoshida being appointed as the mixing engineer and Tetsuji Hayashi as a composer. Konishi was picked for the album as Shinkawa loved the Pizzicato Five, which Konshi was a part of. The members of the band contributed to the songs more than before; lead singer Carlos Toshiki, backing singer Joey McCoy and guitarist Shinji Takashima composing to two songs while keyboardist Toshitsugu Nishihara and composed one song.

The album received mixed reviews from fans, who disliked the direction of the album of not really being soft rock or city pop throughout the entire album.

Track listing

Charts

References 

Omega Tribe (Japanese band) albums
1989 albums